= Antenne NRW =

Private radio station

- Düsseldorf; Germany
- Broadcast area: North Rhine-Westphalia and neighbouring areas (DAB+)
- Branding: ANTENNE NRW – Die besten Hits aller Zeiten!

Programming
- Language: German
- Format: Oldies-based adult contemporary

Ownership
- Owner: The Radio Group Holding GmbH

History
- First air date: 29 October 2021

Links
- Webcast: www.antenne.nrw/webradio/live
- Website: www.antenne.nrw

Antenne NRW is a private radio station for North Rhine-Westphalia, Germany, broadcasting via DAB+ and as an online stream.

The station began regular programming on 29 October 2021 and targets an audience of 30- to 59-year-olds with a music format focused on pop hits from the 1980s and 1990s under the slogan "Die besten Hits aller Zeiten" ["the best hits of all time"].

It was launched by the Antenne Bayern Group as a state-wide commercial service and, from 1 July 2025, has been part of the Frankfurt-based Radio Group media company.

== Programming ==
Since 29 October 2021, Antenne NRW has been broadcasting a full programme consisting of the elements of music, information, entertainment and service.

Advertised music format includes pop music of the past decades with a focus on the 1980s and 1990s. On the hour, news, weather forecast and traffic service for North Rhine-Westphalia can be heard.

The team from the very beginning includes Olivia Powell, Henri Sarafov, Jens Weber, Jörn Ehlert, Katharina Kuntic and Stefan Haase. While Powell, Sarafov and Weber act as presenters, Haase, Ehlert and Kuntic report as NRW reporters from all over the state.

Since 2 November 2021, the morning show Guten Morgen NRW has been running during the week, initially presented by Jörn Ehlert before Christian vom Hofe took over from January 2022.

== Reception facilities ==
Since 29 October 2021, Antenne NRW has been distributed via DAB+ in the state-wide digital radio multiplex of audio.digital NRW GmbH on channel 9D (208.064 MHz) and as a web stream.
